General elections were held in Romania in July 1927. The Chamber of Deputies was elected on 7 July, whilst the Senate was elected in three stages on 10, 12 and 14 July. The result was a victory for the governing National Liberal Party (PNL), which won 318 of the 387 seats in the Chamber of Deputies and 92 of the 110 seats in the Senate elected through universal male vote.

Results

Chamber of Deputies

Senate

References

Parliamentary elections in Romania
Romania
1927 in Romania
Romania
Election and referendum articles with incomplete results
1927 elections in Romania